Dicranoweisia brevipes is a species of moss that occurs on the Antarctic Peninsula and regional islands.

References

Bryopsida
Flora of the Antarctic